The Story of Han Dynasty is a Chinese television series based on the events in the Chu–Han Contention, an interregnum between the fall of the Qin dynasty and the founding of the Han dynasty in Chinese history. The series was first broadcast on CCTV in China in 2003. Directed by Wei Handao, the series starred Hu Jun, Xiao Rongsheng, Jacklyn Wu, Kristy Yang, Wang Gang and Li Li-chun.

Cast

 Hu Jun as Xiang Yu
 Kristy Yang as Consort Yu
 Xin Ming as Fan Zeng
 Cai Yuanxiang as Xiang Bo
 Guo Jun as Xiang Zhuang
 Chen Zhihui as Ji Bu
 Yu Yang as Yu Ziqi
 Hu Longyin as Zhongli Mo
 Han Dong as Long Ju
 Yang Jingjing as Jun'er
 Xiao Rongsheng as Liu Bang
 Jacklyn Wu as Lü Zhi
 Shen Aojun as Lady Cao
 Wu Yue as Han Xin
 Shen Baoping as Zhang Liang
 Zhang Nan as Fan Kuai
 Hou Yueqiu as Lu Wan
 Chen Hai as Zhou Bo
 Zhang Chunzhong as Xiahou Ying
 Yang Guang as Xiao He
 Zhou Da as Cao Shen
 Wang Jian'an as Guan Ying
 Fu Bin as Chen Ping
 Zhang Rihui as Wang Ling
 Zhang Wei as Lu Gu
 Zhang Xuewen as Li Yiji
 Tong Zhongqi as Shen Yiji
 Liu Fei as Consort Qi
 Mei Lina as Consort Bo
 Chen Youwang as Liu Taigong
 Jiang Guoyin as Lü Gong
 Yi Yan as Lü Xu
 Guo Minghan as Ying Bu
 Wu Weiling as Junji
 Zhu Xiaochun as Peng Yue
 Ma Yugui as Shusun Tong
 Wang Gang as Zhao Gao
 Li Li-chun as Li Si
 Lei Ming as Qin Shi Huang
 Jia Zhaoji as Qin Er Shi
 Jia Shitou as Zhang Han
 Wang Yingqi as She Jian
 Zang Jinsheng as Wang Li
 Dong Zhihua as Sima Xin
 Cui Yugui as Dong Yi
 Wang Guoliang as Su Jiao
 Wang Yi as Xiang Liang
 Wang Yingxin as Emperor Yi of Chu
 Yu Caifa as Song Yi
 Tian Youchen as Chen Ying
 Liu Jun as Yong Chi
 Shao Tong as Lü Chen
 Zhao Jian as Gong Ao
 Cao Guoxin as Chen Yu
 Qi Jingbin as Zhang Er
 Zhao Gang as Kuai Tong
 Song Lina as Yueji
 Bo Guanjun as Huang Shigong
 Guo Wenxue as Pei County magistrate
 Lu Peng as Chen Sheng

Releases
The series was aired on CCTV as 21 television films in mainland China. In Hong Kong, Taiwan, and other regions, the series was broadcast in the form of 50 episodes, each roughly about 45 minutes long.

External links
  The Story of Han Dynasty official page on ATV's website
  The Story of Han Dynasty page on axn
  The Story of Han Dynasty on Sina.com
  上海三九文化発展有限公司（製作会社）紹介頁
  BS日テレ

2003 Chinese television series debuts
Television series set in the Western Han dynasty
Television series set in the Qin dynasty
Chinese historical television series
Mandarin-language television shows